Back in Black is the tenth studio album by American hip hop group Cypress Hill. It was released on March 18, 2022.

The album includes 10 tracks. Unlike Elephants on Acid (2018), the group's previous album, which was produced by DJ Muggs, this album was solely produced by Black Milk.

Reception
Back in Black was met with generally favorable reviews from critics. At Metacritic, which assigns a normalized rating out of 100 to reviews from mainstream publications, the album received an average score of 75 based on nine reviews. The aggregator Album of the Year has the critical consensus of the album at a 73 out of 100, based on twelve reviews.

Track listing

Personnel
Cypress Hill
 B-Real – vocals (all tracks), engineering (track 2)
 Sen Dog – vocals (all tracks), engineering (2)
 Eric Bobo – drums, percussion

Additional personnel
 Black Milk – production, mixing
 Drew Drucker – mastering, engineering (1, 3–10)
 Aaron Diaz – engineering (1, 3–10), vocal engineering (all tracks)
 Dominic Thiroux – engineering (1, 3–10), vocal engineering (all tracks)
 Raphael Lamotta – creative direction
 Dana Diaz-Tutaan – layout design

Charts

References

External links

2022 albums
Cypress Hill albums
Albums produced by Black Milk